Thomas Kershaw may refer to:

 Thomas Kershaw (1819–1898), British pioneer of marbleizing
 Thomas A. Kershaw, owner of the Cheers Beacon Hill bar in Boston